Robert Watson (September 1, 1863 – May 4, 1930) was a civil servant and political figure in Newfoundland. He represented Trinity Bay in the Newfoundland and Labrador House of Assembly from 1897 to 1900, from 1902 to 1904 and from 1908 to 1913 as a Conservative and later as a member of the People's Party.

He was born in Hant's Harbour, the son of Ellis C. Watson. He served in the Executive Council as Minister of Posts and Telegraphs from 1897 to 1900 and colonial secretary from 1909 to 1913. Watson was manager of the Newfoundland Savings Bank from 1913 to 1916.  He served as private secretary to the Governor of Newfoundland from 1916 to 1930. He died in St. John's at the age of 66.

Watson was a founding member of the FOMOWA Fishing Club (FO for Forks Pool on the Grand River and Foote, Samuel J, founding member; MO for Monroe, Walter S and Morey, J, founding members, and WA for Watson, Hon. Robert and Warren, William Robertson, founding members).

References 
 

Newfoundland People's Party MHAs
1863 births
1906 deaths
Dominion of Newfoundland politicians
Newfoundland Colony people
Colonial Secretaries of Newfoundland